Alexandru Bourceanu  (born 24 April 1985) is a Romanian former footballer. He played as a defensive midfielder and was known for his combative playing style, being physically strong in spite of his short stature.

Career

Steaua București
Born in Galaţi, Bourceanu has played central defensive midfielder for various local clubs. He transferred from Politehnica Timișoara to Steaua București in the summer of 2011. After just 10 league matches, Bourceanu became team's captain.

Trabzonspor
On 3 February 2014, Trabzonspor completed a 3.5-year deal for an undisclosed fee for the 28-year-old midfielder who had less than 6 months left on his contract. He was loaned back home to recover completely from an injury.

Arsenal Tula
On 13 January 2017, he signed a contract with the Russian Premier League side FC Arsenal Tula. The contract is for 1.5 years with an additional 1-year extension option.

SCM Gloria Buzău
On 29 October 2019, Bourceanu signed a one-season contract with Liga II side SCM Gloria Buzău.

Honours

Club
FCSB
Romanian Liga I: 2012–13, 2013–14, 2014–15
Romanian Cup: 2014–15
Romanian League Cup: 2014–15, 2015–16
Romanian Supercup: 2013

Career statistics 

Statistics accurate as of match played 24 December 2019

References

External links
 
 
 
 
 
 
 
 

	

1985 births
Living people
Sportspeople from Galați
Romanian footballers
Romania international footballers
Association football midfielders
FCM Dunărea Galați players
ASC Oțelul Galați players
FC Politehnica Timișoara players
FC Steaua București players
Trabzonspor footballers
FC Arsenal Tula players
FC Dunărea Călărași players
FC Gloria Buzău players
Liga I players
Süper Lig players
Liga II players
Russian Premier League players
Romanian expatriate footballers
Romanian expatriate sportspeople in Turkey
Expatriate footballers in Turkey
Romanian expatriate sportspeople in Russia
Expatriate footballers in Russia